South Carolina Highway 12 may refer to:

South Carolina Highway 12, a current state highway from West Columbia to south of Lugoff
South Carolina Highway 12 (1920s), a former state highway from south of North Augusta to West Columbia
South Carolina Highway 12 (1930s), a former state highway from near Van Wyck to northeast of Hancock

12 (disambiguation)